Eleven Songs may refer to:

Eleven Songs (album), a 1999 compilation album by As Friends Rust
Eleven Songs, a 2001 album by Regina Hexaphone
Eleven Songs, a 2008 album by Luka Bloom
Eleven Songs and Two Harmonizations, a 1968 composition by Charles Ives
Eleven Songs from A Shropshire Lad, a song cycle by George Butterworth (1885-1916)

See also
"Eleven Sons", a short story by Franz Kafka
Pancarte pour une porte d'entrée (Tailleferre), sometimes erroneously called Eleven Songs